The E. R. Shields House, at 351 St. Patrick in Tonopah, Nevada, United States, was built in 1904.  It includes Late Victorian details in a largely "Neo-Colonial" design.  It was listed on the National Register of Historic Places in 1982.

A survey of Nye County historic properties identified it as significant "for its architecture as one of the best preserved, well crafted wood frame houses in Tonopah" and also for its association with Tonopah merchant E.R. Shields, who lived in Tonopah from 1902 to 1919.

References 

Houses in Nye County, Nevada
Tonopah, Nevada
Houses completed in 1904
Houses on the National Register of Historic Places in Nevada
National Register of Historic Places in Tonopah, Nevada
Victorian architecture in Nevada